Gord's Gold is a compilation album released by Canadian singer-songwriter Gordon Lightfoot in 1975. Originally a vinyl double album, it was reissued on CD in 1987 (with one track, "Affair on 8th Avenue", omitted to allow the collection to fit onto a single disc). However, the track is included for digital downloads.

The first Lightfoot compilation to feature music from his 1970s Reprise Records albums, Gord's Gold also includes re-recorded versions of several songs from his 1960s United Artists output (Sides 1 and 2). This served to update the earlier songs to the same style as his later work and gives the album a level of consistency often lacking in similar compilations. Lightfoot's reasons for re-recording the United Artists tracks were explained in the liner notes as being because "he doesn't like listening to his early work".

Despite covering only the first decade of his career (and lacking one of his biggest hit singles, "The Wreck of the Edmund Fitzgerald", which was recorded the following year), Gord's Gold has remained the most commercially popular Lightfoot compilation. Of note, the 45 remix of “If You Could Read My Mind” appears here. In 1988 Lightfoot released a second volume, Gord's Gold, Vol. 2, which also featured re-recordings of earlier hits.

Track listing
All tracks written by Gordon Lightfoot; all tracks produced by Lenny Waronker, except where noted.

Notes
"Affair on 8th Avenue" is excluded in the CD release but is included with the digital download.

Personnel
 Guitar: Gordon Lightfoot, Red Shea, Terry Clements
 Bass: Rick Haynes, John Stockfish
 Steel Guitar: Pee Wee Charles (a/k/a Ed Ringwald)
 Drums: Jim Gordon, Barry Keane
 String arrangements: Nick DeCaro and Lee Holdridge

Notes 

Gordon Lightfoot albums
1975 greatest hits albums
Albums arranged by Lee Holdridge
Albums produced by Joe Wissert
Albums produced by Lenny Waronker
Reprise Records compilation albums